The 1952 season was the 22nd completed season of Finnish Football League Championship, known as the Mestaruussarja.

Overview
The Mestaruussarja was administered by the Finnish Football Association and the competition's 1952 season was contested by 10 teams. KTP Kotka won the championship and the two lowest placed teams of the competition, TPK Turku and TPS Turku, were relegated to the Suomensarja.

League standings

Results

Footnotes

References
Finland - List of final tables (RSSSF)

Mestaruussarja seasons
Fin
Fin
1